The 2002 Penn Quakers football team represented the University of Pennsylvania in the 2002 NCAA Division I-AA football season. It was the 128th season of play for the Quakers. They were led by 11th-year head coach Al Bagnoli and played their home games at Franklin Field. They were a member of the Ivy League. They finished the season 9–1 and 7–0 in Ivy League play.

On November 16, before their annual game against Harvard, Penn became the first Division I-AA team to host an episode of ESPN's "College GameDay". The weekly national pregame show had begun broadcasting live from the site of a selected marquee matchup in 1993, though some weeks were produced in the studio in Bristol, Connecticut. By November 2002, ESPN had aired 94 shows from "on the road", all at the sites of Division I-A matchups. Coverage plans were decided less than a week ahead of time, which allowed ESPN to respond quickly when the Ivy League called to suggest hosting GameDay at the site where its two contenders for the conference title, with identical 5–0 league records, would meet. The pregame broadcast outside Franklin Field attracted a crowd of 900, and the presence of ESPN cameras was credited for boosting game attendance by about 5,000.

Schedule

References

Penn
Penn Quakers football seasons
Ivy League football champion seasons
Penn Quakers football